Mount Ephraim is a  mountain near Springfield, Vermont, U.S. and the highest land mass in the Precision Valley.  It features one of several mysterious stone monuments that appear through the area.

External links 

Mount Ephraim, Vermont at MountainZone.com

Ephraim
Mountains of Windsor County, Vermont